Frank en Eva (English release title: Living Apart Together) is a 1973 Dutch film which features the debut performance of Sylvia Kristel.

It was released in France in 1977 and recorded admissions of 193,473.

References

External links

1973 films
Dutch romantic drama films
1970s Dutch-language films